The 2014 UNAF U-20 Tournament was the 8th edition of the UNAF U-20 Tournament. The tournament took place in Misurata, Libya, from March 18 to 21, 2014. Senegal won the competition after topping the group stage.

Participants
 (hosts)

 (invited)

Tournament

Matches

Champions

References

2014 in African football
UNAF U-20 Tournament
UNAF U-20 Tournament